The R327 is a Regional Route in South Africa. Its a regional route in the Wester Province and connects Mossel Bay to Ladismith and part of the northern route is a gravel road.

Route
Its northern origin is from the R62 near Ladismith. From there it winds generally south-east. It goes over Cloete's Pass before reaching Herbertsdale. On the other side of the town it crosses the Du Plessis Pass. It then reaches its south-eastern terminus at the N2 near Mossel Bay.

External links
 Routes Travel Info
 Cloete's Pass
 Du Plessis Pass

References

Regional Routes in the Western Cape